Goraj  (German Gorrey) is a settlement in the administrative district of Gmina Sztum, within Sztum County, Pomeranian Voivodeship, in northern Poland.

For the history of the region, see History of Pomerania.

The settlement has a population of 10.

References

Goraj